Custer is a city in Custer County, South Dakota, United States. The population was 1,919 at the 2020 census.  It is the county seat of Custer County.

History

Custer is the oldest town established by European Americans in the Black Hills.  Gold was discovered east of Custer during the Black Hills Expedition, conducted by the 7th Cavalry led by Lt. Colonel George Armstrong Custer, a discovery which initiated the Black Hills Gold Rush.

For thousands of years, the Black Hills had been part of the territory of varying tribes of indigenous peoples. They were within historical territory of the Oglala Sioux at the time of United States encounter, and within the Great Sioux Reservation established by the US Treaty of Fort Laramie (1868). Having established dominance in the area by the eighteenth century, the Oglala Sioux had long considered the Black Hills as sacred land.

After increasing encroachment by  Americans and violent confrontations, the U.S. government forced the Sioux to cede much of the Black Hills in 1877, and opened the land for individual purchase and settlement.  In 1875 trespassing gold-boomers named their settlement Stonewall (after the Confederate general, Stonewall Jackson), but it was renamed for Custer. Almost abandoned in 1876 after word of the much larger gold strikes in Deadwood Gulch spread, Custer later became an established city.

Custer has had a smaller population and been less wealthy than the Northern Hills cities of Deadwood and Lead. In addition to gold, Custer and other cities based their economies on the extraction of industrial minerals, which are still important to the regional economy.

Custer annually observes a "Gold Discovery Days" celebration and festivities over the last full weekend of July.  This heritage tourism event celebrates the embezzlement of gold by the Custer expedition in nearby French Creek and the subsequent founding of the town.

Geography

Custer has been assigned the ZIP code 57730 and the FIPS place code 15140. Its primary telephone exchange is 673 in area code 605.

Climate
Custer has a humid continental climate (Köppen Dfb/Dwb) with summers featuring very warm afternoons and cool mornings, and cold, extremely variable winters.

Winter weather is dominated by the conflict between cold Arctic air moving south from Canada, and very warm chinook winds which can produce exceptionally high winter temperatures for the latitude and altitude.

The coldest month has been January 1957, which averaged  and included twenty-two mornings reaching  – in contrast only one morning fell below zero Fahrenheit in the winter of 2015–16. On average the first temperature of  will occur around November 25, and the last around March 8, whilst the corresponding window for freezing temperatures is from September 6 to June 2, allowing a frost-free season of only ninety-five days. The frequent chinooks limit snow cover: even in January the mean is only . The most snow on the ground in Custer has been  on April 15, 1927.

Custer's altitude makes summers much milder than in the Great Plains proper: only seven afternoons rise above  and  has been reached only once in 1954.

Demographics

2010 census
As of the census of 2010, there were 1987 people, 956 households, and 535 families living in the city. The racial makeup of the city was 94.8% White, 0.5% African American, 2.6% Native American, 0.2% Asian, 0.5% from other races, and 1.4% from two or more races. Hispanic or Latino of any race were 2.6% of the population.

There were 956 households, of which 24.3% had children under the age of 18 living with them, 44.5% were married couples living together, 8.2% had a female householder with no husband present, 3.3% had a male householder with no wife present, and 44.0% were non-families. 40.2% of all households were made up of individuals, and 16.6% had someone living alone who was 65 years of age or older. The average household size was 2.06 and the average family size was 2.74.

The median age in the city was 47.5 years. 21.2% of residents were under the age of 18; 5.1% were between the ages of 18 and 24; 21.2% were from 25 to 44; 29.7% were from 45 to 64; and 22.9% were 65 years of age or older. The gender makeup of the city was 47.8% male and 52.2% female.

2000 census
As of the census of 2000, there were 1,860 people, 825 households, and 491 families living in the city.  The population density was 1,033.6 people per square mile (399.0/km2).  There were 934 housing units at an average density of 519.0 per square mile (200.3/km2).  The racial makeup of the city was 95.97% White, 0.38% African American, 1.61% Native American, 0.16% Asian, 0.38% from other races, and 1.51% from two or more races. Hispanic or Latino of any race were 1.51% of the population.

There were 825 households, out of which 27.8% had children under the age of 18 living with them, 48.6% were married couples living together, 9.0% had a female householder with no husband present, and 40.4% were non-families. 36.5% of all households were made up of individuals, and 16.6% had someone living alone who was 65 years of age or older.  The average household size was 2.17 and the average family size was 2.85.

In the city, the population was spread out, with 23.3% under the age of 18, 6.8% from 18 to 24, 24.6% from 25 to 44, 25.7% from 45 to 64, and 19.6% who were 65 years of age or older.  The median age was 42 years. For every 100 females, there were 92.5 males.  For every 100 females age 18 and over, there were 86.6 males.

As of 2000 the median income for a household in the city was $31,739, and the median income for a family was $41,313. Males had a median income of $28,942 versus $19,688 for females. The per capita income for the city was $17,216.  About 6.7% of families and 11.3% of the population were below the poverty line, including 13.9% of those under age 18 and 13.2% of those age 65 or over.

Although the incorporated city has a small population, many residents associated with it and the workforce live outside the city limits in unincorporated Custer County.  A steady stream of tourists year round and those attracted to the annual Sturgis Motorcycle Rally add much to the economy and seasonal population of the city.

Economy

In addition to continued mining of precious metals, industrial minerals form the basis of today's local mining industry.  Timber harvesting and production, tourism, and government services form the basis for the economy.  Custer is the headquarters for the Supervisor of the Black Hills National Forest of South Dakota and Wyoming.  It is convenient to major tourist attractions, such as Jewel Cave National Monument, Wind Cave National Park, Custer State Park, and Mount Rushmore National Memorial.  The Crazy Horse Memorial is located just north of the city.

An 87-bed hospital, Custer Regional, provides general medical, surgical, and emergency room services.

Radio
KFCR AM 1490, owned by Mt. Rushmore Broadcasting, Inc.

Notable people
Curtis Allgier (b. 1979), convicted murderer
Tyler Schultz (b. 1994), American shot putter and silver medalist at the 2011 World Youth Championships in Athletics

Notable animals
Custer Wolf

Bibliography
 Charles Badger Clark: The Story of Custer City, S.D. (1941)

References

External links

 

Black Hills
Cities in South Dakota
Cities in Custer County, South Dakota
County seats in South Dakota
Populated places established in 1875
1875 establishments in Dakota Territory